The Pakistan Interfaith League is an interfaith organization in Pakistan.

Its chairman, Sajid Ishaq, is a member of the Pakistan Tehreek-e-Insaf,  a centrist, progressive political party in Pakistan.

Protection of minority rights
In April 2016, at a gathering of Muslim and Christian religious leaders to pay tributes to Soran Singh, who was a member of the Provincial Assembly of Khyber Pakhtunkhwa, Hafiz Tahir Ashrafi of All Pakistan Ulema Council highlighted Soran Singh's efforts for interfaith harmony in Pakistan.

Pakistan Interfaith League's chairman, Sajid Ishaq said that non-Muslims living in Pakistan do not need to be afraid of anyone as Pakistan also belongs to non-Muslims. Another speaker at the event said that Pakistan was created with coordinated support of people of all different religions.

Bishop Mazhar Ishaq stated that it was a sign of hope for non-Muslims living in Pakistan to see people from different religions gathered at this event.

See also
All Pakistan Minorities Alliance
Religious discrimination in Pakistan

References 

Interfaith organizations
Religious organisations based in Pakistan
Secularism in Pakistan